The Forty-eighth Oklahoma Legislature was a meeting of the legislative branch of the government of Oklahoma, composed of the Senate and the House of Representatives. It met in Oklahoma City from January 2, 2001 to January 7, 2003, during the second two years of the second term of Governor Frank Keating.

Dates of sessions
Organizational day: January 2, 2001
First regular session: February 2001 – May 2001
Second regular session: February 2002 – May 2002
Previous: 47th Legislature • Next: 49th Legislature

Party composition

Senate

House of Representatives

Major legislation

Enacted
Anna McBride Act – HB 2105 expanded the use of mental health courts.
Cattle theft – HB 2304 authorized sheriffs to form regional task forces to investigate and prevent cattle theft
Crimes – SB 1536 created a life without parole penalty for repeat sex offenders.
Crimes – SB 1638 required DNA sample for felony prosecution of prostitution.
Crimes – HB 2836 made it a felony to steal or receive stolen farm equipment.
Mental health – HB 2149 created the Mental Health and Substance Abuse Treatment of Minors Act.
School curriculum – SB 815 required schools to instruct students in Dr. Martin Luther King Jr. "I have a dream" speech.
Victims – SB 1650 required law enforcement to inform victims of 24-hour statewide hotline.
Vulnerable adults – SB 1560 created court-appointed advocate for vulnerable adults program.

Leadership

Senate

Democratic
President Pro Tempore: Stratton Taylor

Republican
Republican Leader:

House of Representatives

Democratic
 Speaker: Larry Adair
 Speaker Pro Tempore: Terry Matlock
 Majority Floor Leader: Danny Hilliard
 Appropriations and Budget Chair: Mike Mass
 Caucus Chair: David Braddock
 Caucus Secretary: Kenneth Corn

Republican
 Republican Leader: Fred Morgan
 Caucus Chair: Forrest Claunch
 Caucus Vice Chair: Greg Piatt
 Caucus Secretary: Bill Case

Members

Senate

House of Representatives

References

Oklahoma legislative sessions
2001 in Oklahoma
2002 in Oklahoma
2001 U.S. legislative sessions
2002 U.S. legislative sessions